The All Mitsubishi Lions are an American football team located in Hachiōji, Tokyo, Japan.  They are a member of the X-League.

Team history
2001 Team Founded. First named the Lions Finished 4th in the Central division (2 wins, 3 losses).
2002 Finished 3rd in the East Division (3 wins, 2 losses).
2003 New sponsorship with Mitsubishi Electric. Team renamed the All Mitsubishi Lions. Finished 4th in the Central Division (1 win, 3 losses, 1 tie).
2004 Finished 3rd in the East division (1 win, 2 losses, 2 ties).
2010 Finished 4th in the East division (2 wins, 3 losses).
2011 Finished 3rd in the East division (3 wins, 2 losses). Advanced to the 2nd stage Super9 for the first time in team history. Lost 2nd stage matches to Obic 0-49 and to Asahi Soft Drinks 3-24.
2012 Finished 5th in the Central division (1 win, 4 losses).
2013 Finished 4th in the Central division (2 wins, 3 losses). Qualified for the 2nd stage Battle9. Advanced to the Battle9 Final where they defeated the Elecom Kobe Finies 24–21.
2014 Finished 4th in the Central division (2 wins, 3 losses). Advanced to the Battle9 Final where they defeated the As One Black Eagles 35–10.
2015 Finished 4th in the East division (2 wins, 3 losses). Advanced to the Battle9 Final for the 3rd consecutive year where they defeated the As One Black Eagles 24–21.

Name
From 2001 to 2002, the team was simply known as the Lions. Beginning in 2003, the team became sponsored by Mitsubishi and thus were renamed the All Mitsubishi Lions.

Seasons

Current Import Players

References

External links
  (Japanese)

American football in Japan
2001 establishments in Japan
American football teams established in 2001
X-League teams